The Fancott Miniature Railway (FMR) is a  gauge railway located in the gardens of the Fancott public house in Fancott (near Toddington), Bedfordshire, England. The track is laid in an oval with a triangular junction giving access to the station and with a separate steaming bay inside the oval. The FMR is part of Britain's Great Little Railways.

References

External links
Aerial view

7¼ in gauge railways in England
Miniature railways in the United Kingdom